Twin Buttes, Arizona may refer to one of two locations within Arizona:

 Twin Buttes, Navajo County, Arizona, a populated place in Navajo County
 Twin Buttes, Pima County, Arizona, a populated place in Pima County